The Left Worker-communist Party of Iraq is a small political party in Iraq, formed in 2004.

The party was formed by a group of communists, some of whom were members in the Worker-Communist Party of Iraq soon after the WCPIraq decided to support the Worker-Communist Party of Iran - Hekmatist; the Left tendency was to desire to maintain links with the Worker-Communist Party of Iran, believing that group held to a clear revolutionary and socialist position and maintained the line of Worker Communism as laid out by its founder, Mansoor Hekmat.

The current leader of LWPI is Issam Shukri. He is also a member of Central Committee and Politburo of WPI.

External links
LWPI official site

Communist parties in Iraq
Political parties established in 2004
Worker-communist parties